Moderna tider may refer to:
 Moderna tider, Swedish language title for the 1936 film Modern Times
 Moderna tider (magazine), a Swedish magazine founded in 1990 by Göran Rosenberg
 Moderna Tider (album), a 1981 album by Swedish pop group Gyllene Tider
 Moderna tider (television program), a Swedish TV program on TV3